A two-cube calendar is a desk calendar consisting of two cubes with faces marked by digits 0 through 9. Each face of each cube is marked with a single digit, and it is possible to arrange the cubes so that any chosen day of the month (from 01, 02, ... through 31) is visible on the two front faces.

A puzzle about the two-cube calendar was described in Gardner's column in Scientific American. In the puzzle discussed in Mathematical Circus (1992), two visible faces of one cube have digits 1 and 2 on them, and three visible faces of another cube have digits 3, 4, 5 on them. The cubes are arranged so that their front faces indicate the 25th day of the current month. The problem is to determine digits hidden on the seven invisible faces.

Gardner wrote he saw a two-cube desk calendar in a store window in New York. According to a letter received by Gardner from John S. Singleton (England), Singleton patented the calendar in 1957, but the patent lapsed in 1965.

A number of variations are manufactured and sold as souvenirs, differing in the appearance and the existence of additional bars or cubes to set the current month and the day of week.

Solution of the problem 
Digits 1 and 2 need to be placed on both cubes to allow numbers 11 and 22. That leaves us with 4 sides of each cube (total of 8) for another 8 digits. However, digit 0 needs to be combined with all other digits, so it also needs to be placed on both cubes. That means we need to place remaining 7 digits (from 3 to 9) on the remaining 6 sides of cubes. The solution is possible because digit 6 looks like inverted 9.

Therefore, the solution of the problem is:

If the problem is based on another given set of visible digits, the last three digits of each cube could be shuffled between the cubes.

Three-cube variation for the month abbreviations 
A variation with three cubes providing English abbreviations for the twelve months is discussed in a Scientific American column in December 1977. One solution of this variation allows displaying the first three letters of any month and relies on the fact that lower-case letters u and n and also p and d are inverses of each other.

Polish 3-letter month abbreviations (informal but commonly used for date rubber stamps - sty, lut, mar, kwi, maj, cze, lip, sie, wrz, paź, lis, gru) are also feasible, both in lower and upper case:

Four-cube variation 
Using four cubes for two-digit day number from 01 to 31 and two-digit month number from 01 to 12, and assuming that digits 6 and 9 are indistinguishable, it is possible to represent all days of the year. One possible solution is:

The  could be any digit. The last three digits of each cube could be shuffled between the cubes such that each digit from 3 to 9 is placed on at least two different cubes.

With assumption that 6 and 9 are distinguishable characters, it is impossible to represent all days of the year because the necessary number of faces would be 25 and four cubes have only 24 faces. However, it is possible to represent almost all days in the year. There is a family of the best solutions which excludes only one day, namely Nov 11, e.g.:

The last four digits of each cube could be shuffled between the cubes such that no cube has two identical faces (especially the 2's).

Two-Cube Variation for DAY-DATE Display 

Maintaining the condition that two visible faces of two cubes should combine to display  any possible combination of DAY-DATE clearly,  the 6 faces of each cube are divided in 4 quarters each to have 24 spaces (ie 6*4) on each cube (a total of 48 spaces ) for writing the DAY (sun, mon, tues, wed, thurs, fri and sat) and the DATE ( 1 to 31).

FOR the DAY-DATE format of display , the DAY is written adjacent to the right edge of the cube and the DATE is written adjacent to the left edge of the cube in a cyclical manner , so that the two visible faces of  the cubes combine to display all the possible combinations of DAY-DATE clearly and distinctly. The DAY and DATE can be written in any order as long as all the 7 days (sunday through saturday) are written on both the cubes and the 31 dates ( 1 through 31) are split in two groups of 15 and 16 numbers.

One of the possible solutions is:

The original video explaining how to build the day-date cubes can be found on this YouTube Channel

See also 
 Sicherman dice

References

Sources

External links 
 



Calendars
Recreational mathematics